Varty is a surname. Notable people with the surname include:

John Varty (born 1950), South African zoologist and conservationist
Mike Varty (born 1952), American football player
Rowan Varty (born 1986), Hong Kong rugby union player
Will Varty (born 1976), English footballer